Michelle "Mickey" Kelly (born c. 1978) is an American pentathlete who won bronze medals at the 2005 Pan American Championships, 2007 Pan American Games, and Gold at the 2018 Masters World Championship in Halle, Germany.

Kelly is the daughter of Michael and Betsy Kelly. She has six brothers (Jamie, Chris, Casey, Josh, Al and Zilla) and three sisters (Sara, Emilie and Jessinia). In 1996 she graduated from Chatham High School in Chatham, New York, where she trained in cross-country running, basketball and American football, as the only girl on the boys football team. In 2000, she received a Bachelor of Arts degree in teaching from Cortland College. There she took running and swimming and was named the Cortland College Athlete of the Year in 2000. Kelly accolades include a national championship in running , 11-time All American in during her running career in college and 5th place overall in the Army ten-miler.

Kelly is a U.S. Army Major, and has deployed to Iraq and Afghanistan . She has a daughter who was born on November 6, 2011; she resumed top-level competitions just four months after giving birth, and continued low-intensity training throw most of her pregnancy period.

In 2014, Kelly became the 1st female ever to complete Pre-Ranger School at Ft. Drum and was the one of the females to attend Ranger School in 2015.

In the summer of 2018, she competed as a last minute substitution for the United States and won Gold in the International Masters Modern Pentathlon Games in Halle, Germany.

References

American female modern pentathletes
1978 births
Living people
Modern pentathletes at the 2007 Pan American Games
Pan American Games bronze medalists for the United States
Pan American Games medalists in modern pentathlon
Medalists at the 2007 Pan American Games
21st-century American women